SmartWings was the low-cost Brand of the Czech charter airline Travel Service. Travel Service operated scheduled flights to several European metropolitan and leisure destinations under the brand from its base at Václav Havel Airport Prague. In 2018, Travel Service renamed itself to Smartwings.

History 
The brand was established in 2004 by Travel Service, which specialized in leisure charter flights at that time, to offer low-cost scheduled flights. For example, after the bankruptcy of SkyEurope, the company started scheduled services to Paris and Rome.

In October 2017 it was announced that Travel Service planned to move all of its operations under the SmartWings brand.

In 2018, Travel Service has been renamed to Smartwings.

Destinations

Fleet 
As of October 2018, the Smartwings fleet consisted of the following aircraft operated by Travel Service:

References

External links

Official website

Defunct airlines of the Czech Republic
Airlines established in 2004
Airlines disestablished in 2018
Companies based in Prague
Defunct European low-cost airlines
Czech brands
Czech companies established in 2004